Marstonia castor, common name the beaver pond marstonia, is a species of very small freshwater snail with a gill and an operculum, an aquatic operculate gastropod mollusk in the family Hydrobiidae. This species was endemic to a very limited area of the US state of Georgia, mostly to streams and creeks around Lake Blackshear.

The US Fish and Wildlife Service declared this species extinct in December 2017 on the basis that it had not been seen since 2000. It was likely wiped out by groundwater withdrawal, pollution, and urbanization. However, the IUCN Red List still lists it as Critically Endangered.

References

External links
  Thompson F. G. & Hershler R. (2002) Two genera of North American freshwater snails: Marstonia Baker, 1926, resurrected to generic status, and Floridobia, new genus (Prosobranchia: Hydrobiidae: Nymphophilinae). The Veliger 45(3): 269-271

Molluscs of the United States
Hydrobiidae
Gastropods described in 1977
Taxonomy articles created by Polbot